Luther is the debut album by American recording artist group Luther, released in May 1976. The album features Luther Vandross and along with members Anthony Hinton, Diane Sumler, Theresa V. Reed, and Christine Wiltshire.
 
"It's Good for the Soul", "Funky Music (Is a Part of Me)" and "The 2nd Time Around" were released as singles, but the album failed to chart. Vandross bought back the rights to the album after the record label dropped the group, preventing its later re-release.

The song "The 2nd Time Around" was later re-recorded also titled "The Second Time Around" in the closing track on his 1988 album Any Love.

Track listing

Notes 
Track 4: "Everybody Rejoice" is from the Tony Award 7x Winning (including Best Broadway Musical), The Wiz (1975).

Personnel

George Murray, Wilbur Bascomb - bass
Andy Newmark, Darryl Brown, Andrew Smith - drums
Carlos Alomar, Jeff Mironov, Jerry Friedman, Lance Quinn - guitar
Nat Adderley, Jr., Pat Rebillot - keyboards
Anthony Hinton, Luther Vandross - lead vocals
Pablo Rosario, David Friedman - percussion
George Young - soprano saxophone
Paul Riser - arrangements
Gene Orloff - concertmaster
Alfred Brown - contractor (strings & horns)
Executive Producer – David Krevat, Ceilidh Productions, Inc.
Producer, Written-By – Luther Vandross
Anthony Hinton, Christine Wiltshire, Diane Sumler, Luther Vandross, Theresa V. Reed - backing vocals
Album cover design - Abie Sussman - Nick Fasciano - construction - Gerard Huerta - lettering.

Charts

Singles

References

External links
luthervandross.com-timeline

1976 debut albums
Luther Vandross albums
Luther (group) albums
Albums produced by Luther Vandross
Albums arranged by Paul Riser
Cotillion Records albums
Albums recorded at Sigma Sound Studios